Howell is an unincorporated community in Echols County, in the U.S. state of Georgia.

History
A post office called Howell was established in 1899, and remained in operation until 1957.

The Georgia General Assembly incorporated the place in 1905 as the Town of Howell. The town's municipal charter was dissolved in 1995.

References

Former municipalities in Georgia (U.S. state)
Unincorporated communities in Echols County, Georgia
Populated places disestablished in 1995